MasterChef Paraguay is a Paraguayan competitive cooking reality show, based on the original British series of MasterChef, open to amateur and home chefs. Produced by Chena TV, it debuted on April 3, 2018 on Telefuturo.

Amateur chefs compete to become the best amateur home cook in Paraguay through challenges issued by judges Nicolás Bo, Eugenia Aquino and José Torrijos. Paola Maltese is the main host.

Format

Amateur chefs were initially selected through auditions, selecting a total of two hundred competitors to the start of the televised competition. After the preliminary round, the competitors had an opportunity to prepare a signature dish for the trio of judges.

The contestants were given a limited amount of time to prep their dish, and then given five minutes before the three judges to complete the cooking and assembly of the dish, during which the judges ask about their background.

The 3 judges taste the dish, and vote "yes" or "no" to keeping the chef in the competition; 2 "yes" votes are required for the chef to move on and receive a MasterChef apron, while those that fail to do so leave the competition.

Two rounds are then used to trim the number of chefs to 18. One type of challenge has the chefs performing a routine task such as dicing onions, during which the judges will observe their technique.

Judges can advance a chef to the next round or eliminate them at any time during the challenge by taking their apron. A second type of challenge is to have the chefs invent a new dish around a staple ingredient or a theme, with the judges advancing or eliminating players based on the taste of their dishes.

In the third season, the semi-finalists competed in duels of two or three people, where they had to cook a dish with a specific topic; the winner received an apron. There was then a final last-chance cook-off to select the last participant.

Subsequently, the formal competition begins typically following a 2-event cycle that takes place over a 90-minute episode, with a chef eliminated after the second event. The events typically are: Mystery Box Challenge, Team Challenge, Elimination Test and Pressure Test.

This cycle continues until only two chefs remain. The judges then select the winner of MasterChef.

Challenges 

The events typically are:

 Mystery Box: Cooks are all given a box with the same ingredients and must use only those ingredients to create a dish within a fixed amount of time. The judges will taste the dishes, and then select one winner who will gain an advantage in the next test.
 Team Challenge: The cooks are taken to an off-site location and are split into 2 teams by the team captains (typically through a schoolyard pick), with the cook with the best dish in the previous test getting first pick. The teams will typically have to prepare a meal for a number of diners in a limited amount of time or engage in a "restaurant takeover or pop-up restaurant" taking the place of the staff of a particular restaurant. Diners taste both meals and vote for their favourite, causing a team to forfeit a vote if a diner does not end receiving their meal. The winning team advances, while the losing team will participate in the elimination test upon returning to the MasterChef kitchen.
 Elimination Test: The chefs are given a fixed amount of time to complete the dish. Judges evaluate all dishes based on taste and visual appeal. The judges nominate the worst two to four dishes for elimination and criticize them before telling at least one of the home cooks to place their apron on their station and "leave the MasterChef kitchen", eliminating them.
 Pressure Test: Contestants must test their knowledge and skills. The best chef will be rewarded in some way, usually with immunity, ensuring their stay in the competition one week more, or will gain an advantage in the next test.

The contestants have a certain time to perform all the tests, in which they must cook the menu and have it plated, and once finished they can not modify the dishes. The home cooks have 3 minutes to stock up on the ingredients they may need to cook from the supermarket in the indoor tests.

Series overview

First Season (2018)

Top 18

Elimination table

Key

Second Season (2018)

Top 18

Elimination table

Key

Third Season (2019)

Top 21

Elimination table

Key

MasterChef Profesionales

First Season (2019)

Top 18

Elimination table

Key

References

External links

Paraguayan reality television series
Paraguay
Telefuturo original programming
Non-British television series based on British television series
2018 Paraguayan television series debuts
2019 Paraguayan television series endings